The  2007 Beijing Guoan F.C. season  was their 4th consecutive season in the Chinese Super League, established in the 2004 season, and 17th consecutive season in the top flight of Chinese football. They competed at the Chinese Super League.

First team
As of August 26, 2007

Friendlies

Competitions

Chinese Super League

Matches

References

Beijing Guoan F.C. seasons
Chinese football clubs 2007 season